The following is a list of the MTV Europe Music Award winners and nominees for Best Look.

2010s

See also
 List of fashion awards

Awards established in 2012
Fashion awards
MTV Europe Music Awards